Barfotavisan is a summertime song written by Mats Paulson, and recorded by him on the 1974 album Barfota. It also charted at Svensktoppen for six weeks between 15 December 1974-19 January 1975, peaking at eight position

Mats Paulson said the lyrics were inspired by the song "Blåsippor" (with the lines "Nu får vi gå utan strumpor och skor").

References

1974 songs
Swedish songs
Swedish-language songs
Songs written by Mats Paulson